Graboc i Poshtëm (Albanian: also Graboci i Poshtëm) is a village in municipality Fushë Kosova.

Demography

Notes

References 

Villages in Kosovo Polje